Comandante Andresito is a village and municipality in Misiones Province in north-eastern Argentina.

The municipality contains part of the  Urugua-í Provincial Park, created in 1990.

References

Populated places in Misiones Province